Samuel Stevens (born 18 November 1890, date of death unknown) was an English footballer who played for Hull City, Notts County and Coventry City in the Football League.

References

1890 births
English footballers
Association football forwards
Hull City A.F.C. players
Notts County F.C. players
Coventry City F.C. players
English Football League players
Year of death missing
Cradley Heath F.C. players